A musculoskeletal abnormality is a disorder of the musculoskeletal system present at birth.

They can be due to deformity or malformation.

An example is Klippel–Feil syndrome.

Although present at birth, some only become obvious postnatally.

References

External links 

Congenital disorders of musculoskeletal system